Banksia pilostylis is a species of shrub that is endemic to the south-west of Western Australia. It has hard, fissured bark, narrow wedge-shaped, serrated leaves, pale yellow flowers in cylindrical spikes and elliptical follicles that open when heated in a bushfire.

Description
The follicles usually remain closed until the plant is killed in a bushfire.

Taxonomy and naming

Banksia pilostylis was first formally described in 1964 by Charles Gardner in the Journal of the Royal Society of Western Australia from specimens he collected in October 1960. The specific epithet (pilostylis) is from Latin and refers to the hairy style.

In 1981, George placed this species in the series Cyrtostylis. Cladistic analysis in a 1996 paper by Kevin Thiele and Pauline Ladiges confirmed that placement.

Distribution and habitat
This banksia grow in shrubland and low woodland near the south coast of Western Australia between Ravenshorpe and Israelite Bay.

Conservation status
Banksia pilostylis is classified as "not threatened" by the Western Australian Government Department of Parks and Wildlife.

Use in horticulture
Seeds do not require any treatment, and take 18 to 49 days to germinate.

References

pilostylis
Eudicots of Western Australia
Plants described in 1964
Taxa named by Charles Gardner